A Piece of Your Mind is a 2020 South Korean television series starring Jung Hae-in, Chae Soo-bin, Lee Ha-na, and Kim Sung-kyu. It aired on tvN from March 23 to April 28, 2020.

Synopsis
A drama-romance between Moon Ha-won (Jung Hae-In) and Han Seo-woo (Chae Soo-Bin). Moon Ha-won is an AI programmer and he is the founder of AH Company. He is a consistent person with a good heart. Meanwhile, Han Seo-woo works as a classical music recording engineer. Her life is unstable without a family or house, but she is a positive person.

Cast

Main
 Jung Hae-in as Moon Ha-won
 Nam Da-reum as young Moon Ha-won
An artificial intelligence programmer who founded the company AH. He is very serious about his work though he seldom gets angry and is known as being a kind person. His unrequited love is Kim Ji-soo, who is also his childhood friend. He later falls for Han Seo-woo.
 Chae Soo-bin as Han Seo-woo
A classical recording engineer who has a positive and bright personality despite her family and social issues. She gets along with Kim Ji-soo very well. Later, she falls for Ha-won.
 Lee Ha-na as Moon Soon-ho
A gardener and granddaughter of Moon Jung-nam, the diplomat who sponsored Ha-won. She manages her grandmother's garden and flower garden. She calls Ha-won as her uncle, though they are almost of same age. 
 Kim Sung-kyu as Kang In-wook
Lee Se-jin as young Kang In-wook
A pianist who's acclaimed in musical circles for his artistry and skill, but is not widely recognized by the public. Ji-soo's husband.

Supporting
 Kim Jeong-woo as Kim Hoon
 Woo Ji-hyun as Bae Jin-hwan
 Lee Sang-hee as Jeon Eun-joo
 Kang Bong-sung as Kim Chang-seop
 Kim Nu-ri as Choi Soo-ji
 Ye Soo-jung as Eun Soo-jung
 Kim Bo-yeon as Moon Jeong-nam
 Lee Seung-joon as Choi Jin-moo
 Park Ju-hyun as Kim Ji-soo
 Lee Jung-eun as Kim Min-jung

Special appearances
 Jang Hye-jin as Han Seo-woo's mother

Production
Due to the decreasing ratings, and because tvN recorded its lowest ratings in two years during its Monday–Tuesday time slot, it was announced on April 8, 2020 that the series would be shortened by 4 episodes, bringing the total number of episodes to 12.

Original soundtrack

Part 1

Part 2

Part 3

Part 4

Viewership

Notes

References

External links
  
 
 

TVN (South Korean TV channel) television dramas
Korean-language television shows
2020 South Korean television series debuts
2020 South Korean television series endings
South Korean romantic comedy television series
Television series by Studio Dragon